Edward Wyndham Harrington Schenley (1799 – 31 January 1878) was a British Liberal politician, military officer and husband of Mary Elizabeth Croghan, 19th century philanthropist of Pittsburgh, Pennsylvania.

Early life and career

Born in Woolwich, Kent, Schenley's father was an artillery officer who died in Cadiz, Spain in 1813.

Schenley was a volunteer in the Peninsular War and joined the Rifle Brigade as a 15 year old lieutenant in 1814. Subsequently wounded in the Battle of Waterloo, he became friends with Lord Byron.

Schenley served the Crown in Latin America. In 1825 he was appointed Vice Counsel in Guatemala, and in 1828 he became Counsel in Venezuela. In 1836 he was appointed as arbitrator to the British and Spanish joint commission addressing slavery in Cuba.

Schenley was elected Liberal MP for Dartmouth at the 1859 general election, but was three months later unseated after an election petition committee found his win had been secured through bribery and corruption.

Personal life

Schenley married three times, all via elopement.  He married his first wife, Catherine Inglis, in Leghorn (Livorno) Italy in 1823. He lived with her in Edinburgh, Scotland for several years, and she died in Havana, Cuba in 1837.  A son from their union died.

He married a second time Jane Maria Pole, daughter of Sir William Templer Pole, 7th Baronet and Charlotte Fraser. They had one child, Fanny Inglis Schenley (born ). Jane died in 1837.

In 1841, after falling ill en route to the United States, he stopped in Staten Island, New York to recuperate at the home of his sister in law Lydia Inglis McLeod, who ran a school for girls. It was there that Schenley met the then 15 year old Mary Elizabeth Croghan, daughter of William Croghan and Mary O'Hara.  Mary's grandfather, James O'Hara, settled in Pittsburgh prior to the American Revolution in 1773 and became a substantial landowner and businessman in that city. They eloped and were married in New York in early 1842 against the wishes of her widowed father, and they then moved to England.

Schenley and Croghan had eleven children: Elizabeth Pole (–1915); William Croghan (died 1846); Lily (born 1843); Jane Inglis (1844–1925); Henrietta Agnes (born 1847); Clarence Edward Paget (born 1850); Alice (1853–1930); Richard E. M. (born 1853); Nina (born 1855); Hermione Octavia Croghan (–1942); and George Alfred (1861–1934).

References

External links
 

UK MPs 1859–1865
1799 births
1878 deaths
Liberal Party (UK) MPs for English constituencies
Members of the Parliament of the United Kingdom for Dartmouth